The Koman Hydroelectric Power Station is a large hydroelectric power station, for which a dam on the Drin River was built. The dam is near the settlement of Koman, northern Albania. It is the second of three dams on the Drin River; the Fierza Hydroelectric Power Station upstream, and the Vau i Dejës Hydroelectric Power Station downstream. The dam, 130m tall, was completed in 1985 and the reservoir was filled with water at full capacity in 1986.

See also 

Koman and Fierza Reservoirs Ferry
List of power stations in Albania

External links 

Hydroelectric power stations in Albania
Dams completed in 1986
Buildings and structures in Vau i Dejës